Hits to the Head is a greatest hits album by Scottish indie rock band Franz Ferdinand, released on 11 March 2022 through the Domino Recording Company. The album was announced on 2 November 2021, coinciding with the release of the single "Billy Goodbye".

Of the decision to release a greatest hits album, lead singer Alex Kapranos compared the selection process of tracks for it to "writing a set-list for a festival", while further adding: "I have friends who believe you're somehow not a "real" fan if you own a best of rather than a discography. I disagree. I think of my parents' record collection as a kid. I loved their compilation LPs. I am so grateful that they had Changes or Rolled Gold. Those LPs were my entrance point. My introduction."

Track listing

Charts

References

2022 greatest hits albums
Domino Recording Company compilation albums
Franz Ferdinand (band) albums